The Charms are an American garage rock band from Somerville, Massachusetts, United States, who were formed in 2002. Following 8 straight years of releasing records and touring the band went on a hiatus and returned for a few one off shows before releasing the "Deep End Of The Dial" EP in 2015.They have performed on and off the last several years. The first single called "Gimme Your Love" recorded by Scott Riebling (Letters To Cleo) was well received. The most recent lineup consisted of Ellie Vee, Joe Wizda, Kat Kina, Mark Nigro, and Jason Sloan. The band teamed with local Boston based management company Twisted Rico Management (Steev Riccardo) and formed Red Car Records in 2003.

In September 2015, the band released the single "B.O.S.T.O.N", also recorded and mixed by Scott Riebling. Due to having children and other obligations, the band has been on a long break since but have not ruled out reuniting at some point.

Discography

Albums

Other releases
2004 Christmas with the Kranks soundtrack Hollywood Records
2011 The Scandalous Years compilation Twisted Rico Recordings

References

External links
Official website
Red Car Records

Musical groups from Boston
Somerville, Massachusetts
Indie rock musical groups from Massachusetts
Garage punk groups
Garage rock groups from Massachusetts